The “Vitaphone Color Parade” was a series of documentary short films produced by Warner Bros.

Overview
The majority of these one-reel (under 10 minutes) short subjects were produced by Edward Newman of the E. M. Newman Travelogues and co-directed by Ira Genet in New York at the Vitaphone studios, but a few later entries were completed in California. These were directed by Del Frazier with Gordon Hollingshead as producer.

Mechanix Illustrated backed a series that resembled, in part, the Jerry Fairbanks Popular Science (film) series made for rival studio Paramount Pictures. These consisted of individual segments spotlighting technical marvels and took cameras “behind the scenes” to show how popular household items were manufactured.

A few were shot in full Technicolor, but the majority edited in New York utilized the more economical Cinecolor. By 1940, these were replaced by the Sports Parade.

List of titles
List of films by title / major credits (not complete) / release date or copyright date (marked ©) / notes:

See also
E. M. Newman Travelogues
List of short subjects by Hollywood studio#Warner Brothers
Travelogue (films)

Notes

References
 Liebman, Roy Vitaphone Films – A Catalogue of the Features and Shorts 2003 McFarland & Company
 Motion Pictures 1912-1939 Catalog of Copyright Entries 1951 Library of Congress
 Motion Pictures 1940-1949 Catalog of Copyright Entries 1953 Library of Congress
BoxOffice back issue scans

Vitaphone short films
Warner Bros. short films
Documentary film series